Жива вода is the debut studio album by Ukrainian recording artist Khrystyna Soloviy. It was released on 22 September 2015 in Ukraine through Supersymmetry.

Information
The album consists of 12 songs, two of which were written by Khrystyna, the other ten — folk songs (9 Lemko and 1 Ukrainian) in the author's adaptation.

The recording of the album took place in Kyiv, at the studio "ZvukoTseh". The sound-producers of the album were Miloš Jelić and Svyatoslav Vakarchuk. For two songs ("Pod oblachkom" and "Trymai") filmed videos.

Track listing

Release history

References

External links
 Відео на пісню «Под облачком» на YouTube каналі співачки;
 Відео на пісню «Тримай» на YouTube каналі співачки;
 Альбом «Жива вода» на iTunes;
 Альбом «Жива вода» на Google Play Music;
 Альбом «Жива вода» на SoundCloud;

2015 albums